Spyros Danellis (born 28 January 1955) is a Greek politician and a Panhellenic Socialist Movement Member of European Parliament since October 2009.

Political career

Danellis was a Member of the Hellenic Parliament for Synaspismos between 1996 and 2000, and served as mayor of Hersonisos from 2003 to 2009.

Danellis was elected as a PASOK Member of European Parliament in October 2009, and served until June 2014.

References

External links
 
 Official site (Greek)

Living people
MEPs for Greece 2009–2014
PASOK MEPs
Greek MPs 1996–2000
Mayors of places in Greece
Coalition of Left, of Movements and Ecology politicians
1955 births
Politicians from Heraklion
The River (Greece) politicians
Syriza politicians
Greek MPs 2015 (February–August)
Greek MPs 2015–2019